Flower of the North is a surviving 1921 American silent northwoods drama film directed by David Smith and produced and distributed by the Vitagraph Company of America. It starred Henry B. Walthall and Pauline Starke and is based upon the novel of the same name by James Oliver Curwood.

Cast
Henry B. Walthall as Philip Whittemore
Pauline Starke as Jeanne D'Arcambal
Harry Northrup as Thorpe
Joe Rickson as Pierre
Jack Curtis as Blake
Emmett King as D'Arcambal
Walter Rodgers as MacDougal
William McCall as Cassidy
Vincente Howard as Sachigo

Preservation
The film is preserved in a splendid print at Filmmuseum EYE Institut Netherlands with Dutch language intertitles.

References

External links

1921 films
American silent feature films
Vitagraph Studios films
Films directed by David Smith (director)
American black-and-white films
Silent American drama films
1921 drama films
Northern (genre) films
Films based on novels by James Oliver Curwood
1920s American films